Sonam Tsemo (1142–1182) (or Lobpon Rinpoche Sonam Tsemo), an important Tibetan sprititual leader and Buddhist scholar, was the second of the so-called Five Venerable Supreme Sakya Masters of Tibet, the founding fathers of the Sakya tradition.

Life 

He was born in the year of the water dog of the second cycle at Sakya and was acclaimed as an incarnation of Durjayachandra. His mother was called Machik Wodron. He received extensive spiritual training from his father, Sachen Kunga Nyingpo, the first of the five founding fathers of the Sakya-tradition. At age 17, he went to Sangphu Neuthok and deepened his studies under the famous scholar Chapa Chokyi Senge. His studies included Paramita, Madhyamaka, Pramana, Vinaya and Abhidharma. By the time he was eighteen he had mastered the triple discipline of teaching, debate and composition. After his return to Sakya, he held the throne of the monastery for three years and then passed the authority to his younger brother, Jetsun Dragpa Gyaltsen, the third of the five founding fathers. He dedicated the rest of his life to studies and meditation. In 1182 he passed into pure land of Sukhavati, the water tiger year, at age 41. He is said to have attained full Buddhahood.

A 17th-century painting of Sonam Tsemo from Ngor Monastery is held by the Los Angeles County Museum of Art.

References 

 Chogay Trichen, 1983, The History of the Sakya Tradition. Ganesha Press, Bristol.

Further reading 

 Sakyapa Ngawang Kunga Sonam. 2000. Holy Biographies of the Great Founders of the Glorious Sakya Order. Lama Kalsang Gyeltsen, Ani Kunga Chodron, and Victoria Huckenpahler, trans and eds. Silver Spring, MD: Sakya Puntsok Ling Publications

Translations 

Bodhicaryavatara With Commentary. Translated by Adrian O'Sullivan (Dechen Foundation, 2019).

Admission at Dharma's Gate (Sakya Kongma Series, Volume 3).  Translated by Christopher Wilkinson (CreateSpace, 2014).

The Yogini's Eye (Classics of the Early Sakya, Volume 1).  Translated by Hiroshi Somani Gyatso and Wayne Verrill (Xlibris, 2012).

External links 
 TBRC-entry on Sonam Tsemo

1142 births
1182 deaths
Tibetan Buddhists from Tibet
12th-century Tibetan people
12th-century lamas
Sakya Trizins